Atalanta B.C. failed to prolong its Serie A stint by more than one season, due to a poor start to the season. Delio Rossi took over at the helm, and helped by the breakthroughs of striker Stephen Makinwa and playmaker Riccardo Montolivo, Atalanta was able to catch up with the teams above the relegation zone, but went down due to a 1-0 defeat to Roma in the penultimate round.

Squad

Goalkeepers
  Massimo Taibi
  Alex Calderoni
  Nicholas Caglioni

Defenders
  Adriano Pereira
  Gianpaolo Bellini
  Daniele Capelli
  Natale Gonnella
  Duccio Innocenti
  Stefano Lorenzi
  Marco Motta
  Cesare Natali
  Claudio Rivalta
  Luigi Sala

Midfielders
  Demetrio Albertini
  Antonio Bernardini
  Andrea Lazzari
  Riccardo Montolivo
  Michele Marcolini
  Giulio Migliaccio
  Nicola Mingazzini
  Biagio Pagano
  Damiano Zenoni

Attackers
  Igor Budan
  Lampros Choutos
  Gianni Comandini
  Marino Defendi
  Carmine Gautieri
  Stephen Makinwa
  Giampaolo Pazzini
  Piá
  Luca Saudati
  Davide Sinigaglia

Serie A

League table

Matches

 Atalanta-Lecce 2-2
 1-0 Giampaolo Pazzini (1)
 1-1 Guillermo Giacomazzi (8)
 2-1 Demetrio Albertini (51)
 2-2 Valeri Bojinov (76)
 Juventus-Atalanta 2-0
 1-0 David Trezeguet (14)
 2-0 David Trezeguet (58)
 Atalanta-Inter 2-3
 1-0 Igor Budan (25)
 1-1 Dejan Stanković (54)
 1-2 Álvaro Recoba (79)
 2-2 Giampaolo Pazzini (84)
 2-3 Adriano (87)
 Livorno-Atalanta 1-1
 0-1 Carmine Gautieri (71)
 1-1 Luca Vigiani (73)
 Atalanta-Lazio 1-1
 1-0 Carmine Gautieri (11)
 1-1 Roberto Muzzi (85)
 Bologna-Atalanta 2-1
 0-1 Igor Budan (12)
 1-1 Claudio Bellucci (37 pen)
 2-1 Christian Amoroso (60)
 Atalanta-Cagliari 2-2
 1-0 Giampaolo Pazzini (2)
 1-1 Mauro Esposito (12)
 1-2 Simone Loria (29)
 2-2 Riccardo Montolivo (40)
 Milan-Atalanta 3-0
 1-0 Serginho (45 + 2)
 2-0 Jon Dahl Tomasson (53)
 3-0 Kakha Kaladze (71)
 Parma-Atalanta 2-2
 1-0 Alberto Gilardino (40)
 1-1 Igor Budan (45)
 2-1 Alberto Gilardino (55)
 2-2 Riccardo Montolivo (76)
 Atalanta-Sampdoria 0-0
 Chievo-Atalanta 1-0
 1-0 Simone Tiribocchi (74)
 Atalanta-Udinese 0-0
 Atalanta-Reggina 0-1
 0-1 Igor Budan (12 og)
 Palermo-Atalanta 1-0
 1-0 Franco Brienza (43)
 Atalanta-Udinese 0-1
 0-1 Vincenzo Iaquinta (8)
 Messina-Atalanta 1-0
 1-0 Salvatore Sullo (59)
 Atalanta-Fiorentina 1-0
 1-0 Igor Budan (81)
 Roma-Atalanta 2-1
 1-0 Vincenzo Montella (40)
 2-0 Vincenzo Montella (53)
 2-1 Michele Marcolini (85)
 Atalanta-Siena 1-1
 1-0 Davide Sinigaglia (20)
 1-1 Enrico Chiesa (45)
 Lecce-Atalanta 1-0
 1-0 Valeri Bojinov (33)
 Atalanta-Juventus 1-2
 0-1 Rubén Olivera (23)
 0-2 Alessandro Del Piero (35 pen)
 1-2 Lilian Thuram (90 + 2 og)
 Inter-Atalanta 1-0
 1-0 Obafemi Martins (33)
 Atalanta-Livorno 1-0
 1-0 Luigi Sala (23)
 Lazio-Atalanta 2-1
 0-1 Stephen Makinwa (45)
 1-1 Fabio Bazzani (45 + 1)
 2-1 Fabio Liverani (89)
 Atalanta-Bologna 2-0
 1-0 Michele Marcolini (25)
 2-0 Stephen Makinwa (61)
 Cagliari-Atalanta 3-3
 1-0 Antonio Langella (10)
 1-1 Luigi Sala (18)
 2-1 Mauro Esposito (43)
 2-2 Stephen Makinwa (61)
 3-2 Nelson Abeijón (68)
 3-3 Michele Marcolini (90 + 1 pen)
 Atalanta-Milan 1-2
 0-1 Massimo Ambrosini (72)
 1-1 Stephen Makinwa (73)
 1-2 Andrea Pirlo (90 + 4)
 Atalanta-Parma 1-0
 1-0 Adriano Pereira (79)
 Sampdoria-Atalanta 1-2
 0-1 Stephen Makinwa (3)
 1-1 Cristiano Doni (30)
 1-2 Cesare Natali (68)
 Atalanta-Chievo 3-0
 1-0 Michele Marcolini (5 pen)
 2-0 Stephen Makinwa (15)
 3-0 Riccardo Montolivo (54)
 Brescia-Atalanta 1-0
 1-0 Luigi Di Biagio (90 + 4 pen)
 Reggina-Atalanta 0-0
 Atalanta-Palermo 1-0
 1-0 Luigi Sala (88)
 Udinese-Atalanta 2-1
 1-0 Stefano Mauri (2)
 1-1 Andrea Lazzari (4)
 2-1 Vincenzo Iaquinta (36)
 Atalanta-Messina 2-1
 0-1 Riccardo Zampagna (35)
 1-1 Adriano Pereira (48)
 2-1 Antonio Bernardini (53)
 Fiorentina-Atalanta 0-0
 Atalanta-Roma 0-1
 0-1 Antonio Cassano (50)
 Siena-Atalanta 2-1
 1-0 Enrico Chiesa (8)
 1-1 Igor Budan (62)
 2-1 Stefano Argilli (81)

Topscorers
  Stephen Makinwa 6
  Igor Budan 5
  Riccardo Montolivo 3
  Giampaolo Pazzini 3
  Michele Marcolini 3

Sources
  RSSSF - Italy 2004/05

Atalanta B.C. seasons
Atalanta